Ptyas luzonensis, commonly known as the smooth-scaled mountain rat snake, is a species of Rat snake in the family Colubridae. This snake lives in mountainous area but they go for streams and rivers to hunt and drink. Their favourite or common prey is mainly frogs but they also eat rodents, bats and lizards. This species of snake can attain lengths of 6 to 8 feet.

Etymology
The specific name, luzonensis, was given in reference to Luzon, the place of its discovery.

Geographic range
Ptyas luzonensis is endemic to the Philippines, where it is found on the islands of Negros, Luzon, Panay and Polillo.

References

Further reading
 Günther, 1873 : Notes on some reptiles and batrachians obtained by Dr. Adolf Bernhard Meyer in Celebes and the Philippine Islands. Proceedings of the Zoological Society of London,  (Full text).

Colubrids
Snakes of Southeast Asia
Reptiles of the Philippines
Endemic fauna of the Philippines
Taxa named by Albert Günther
Reptiles described in 1873